The Institute of Caucasus Studies of ANAS (Azerbaijan National Academy of Sciences)  - is a scientific research Institute in the structure of ANAS.

Date of foundation 
It was founded on April 29, 2015; its Director was Doctor of Historical Sciences, professor Musa Gasimli.

Structural departments
 Department of the Caucasus Policy
 Department of the Georgian Studies
 Department of  the Armenian Studies
 Department of the North Caucasus
 Department of the Translation, Publication and Information

Main areas of research 
 Internal socio-economic, political and other processes in Caucasus region and its impact on Azerbaijan Republic.
 Foreign policy of the Caucasus region and its impact on Azerbaijan.
 Caucasus policy of The Great powers and neighboring countries, regional organizations and the role of Azerbaijan in their policies.
 Conflicts in the Caucasus region, Armenia's aggression policy,  its groundless territorial claims against Azerbaijan and its results
 Diaspora and lobby activities, approaches of prominent political and public figures on Caucasus region.

Branches of activity
 Publication of Institution's scientific journal, translation and printing, highlighting academic activities on website and disseminating among mass media
 Networking and cooperation with prestigious scientific research centers in foreign countries
 Participation in international symposiums, conferences, and seminars

References

External links
 

Research institutes in Azerbaijan